is a passenger railway station located in the city of Iyo, Ehime Prefecture, Japan. It is operated by JR Shikoku and has the station number "U05".The station is located near Gunchū Port Station on the Gunchū Line, owned by Iyotetsu.

Lines
Connections with other services are needed to travel further east of Matsuyama on the line.

Layout
Iyoshi Station is an above-ground station with a station building adjacent to a single side platform,and connected to an island platform by a footbridge. Platforms are numbered in order from the station building. Platform 1 has a straight through-line structure (there is no speed limit, but it is immediately to the west). Since there is a curve of R300 at the station, outbound trains are slowed down, but there are currently no regular trains passing through this station). Normally, both inbound and outbound trains arrive and depart from Platform 1, and only exchange trains and return trains use Platforms 2 and 3. This station is formally the boundary between non-electrified and electrified sections of the Yosan Line (most trains coming from the direction of Iyo-Hojo terminate at Matsuyama Station), and the west side of this station (towards  and ) is non-electrified. The station building is large and tile-covered.The front portion has been refurbished and  has ticket counters and automatic ticket vending machines.

History
About a month later, the line was renamed to the Yosan Line .At that time, the station was operated by Japanese Government Railways (JGR), later becoming Japanese National Railways (JNR). The station was renamed to its present name on 1 April 1957. A major change in this station was the opening of a new line from Mukaihara Station to Uchiko Station in March 1986.With the privatization of JNR on 1 April 1987, control of the station passed to JR Shikoku.

Surrounding area
 Japan National Route 378, which passes in front of the station.
 Gunchū Port Station - Iyotetsu Gunchū Line
 Iyo City Hall
Iyo Municipal Gunchu Elementary School
 Iyo Municipal Konan Junior High School

See also
 List of railway stations in Japan

References

External links
Station timetable

Railway stations in Ehime Prefecture
Railway stations in Japan opened in 1930
Iyo, Ehime